Raymond Newman is a New Hampshire politician.

Military career
Newman served in the United States Army.

Political career
On November 6, 2018, Newman was elected to the New Hampshire House of Representatives where he represents the Hillsborough 29 district. He assumed office on December 5, 2018. He is a Democrat.

Personal life
Ray Newman resides in Nashua, New Hampshire. Ray is married to fellow state representative Sue Newman. Together they have three children and six grandchildren.

References

Living people
Politicians from Nashua, New Hampshire
Democratic Party members of the New Hampshire House of Representatives
Military personnel from New Hampshire
Spouses of New Hampshire politicians
21st-century American politicians
Year of birth missing (living people)